Events in the year 1931 in Japan.

Incumbents
Emperor: Hirohito
Prime Minister:
Osachi Hamaguchi: until April 14
Wakatsuki Reijirō: April 14 – December 13
Inukai Tsuyoshi: from December 13

Governors
Aichi Prefecture:
starting 20 January: Masao Oka
20 January-21 December: Kosaka Masayasu
until 21 December: Yujiro Osaki
Akita Prefecture: Koki Hiegata (until 18 December); Takeshi Uchida (starting 18 December)
Aomori Prefecture: Migaku Moriya (until 18 December); Teizaburo Miyamoto (starting 18 December)
Ehime Prefecture: Koichiro Sasai (until 18 December); Kume Shigeo (starting 18 December)
Fukui Prefecture: Tachibana Saitanao (until 18 December); Keizo Ichimura (starting 18 December)
Fukushima Prefecture:
until 15 April: Koyanagi Makimamoru
15 April-18 December: Goro Kawasaki
starting 18 December: Murai Hachiro
Gifu Prefecture:
until 8 May: Ken Usawa
8 May-18 December: Yoshida Katsutaro
starting 18 December: Takehiko Ito
Gunma Prefecture:
until 27 June: Hotta Kanae
27 June-18 December: Kiichi Harata
starting 18 December: Masao Kanazawa
Hiroshima Prefecture:
until 8 May: Hiroshi Kawabuchi
8 May-18 December: Takekai Shirane
starting 18 December: Ryo Chiba
Ibaraki Prefecture:
until 27 June: Shozo Ushijima
27 June-18 December: Tanaka
starting 18 December: Seikichi Kimishima
Ishikawa Prefecture: Nakano Kunikazu (until month unknown)
Iwate Prefecture: Toyoshiro Kubo (until 18 December); Hidehiko Ishiguro (starting 18 December)
Kagawa Prefecture:
until 27 June: Susumu Tsuboi
27 June-18 December: Yusai Takahashi
starting 18 December: Akira Ito
Kanagawa Prefecture: Jiro Yamagata (until month unknown)
Kochi Prefecture:
until 27 June: Tanaka
27 June-18 December: Tsuboi
starting 18 December: Kodora Akamatsu
Kumamoto Prefecture: Bunpei Motoyama (until 18 December); Kenichi Yamashita (starting 18 December)
Kyoto Prefecture:
until October: Sasaki Shinichi
October-December: Shinya Kurosaki
starting December: Sukenari Yokoyama
Mie Prefecture: Keizo Ichimura (until 18 December); Hirose Hisatada (starting 18 December)
Miyagi Prefecture: Michio Yuzawa
Miyazaki Prefecture:
until 18 December: Ariyoshi
18 December-21 December: Kiyoshi Nakarai
starting 21 December: Gisuke Kinoshita
Nagano Prefecture: Shintaro Suzuki (until 18 December); Ishigaki Kuraji (starting 18 December)
Niigata Prefecture:
until 2 October: Toyoji Obata
2 October-18 December: Nakano Kunikazu
starting 18 December: Obata Toyoji
Okinawa Prefecture: Jiro Ino
Osaka Prefecture: Saito Munenori (starting month unknown)
Saga Prefecture: 
 until 18 December: Inoue
 20 January-18 December: Nakarai Kiyoshi
 starting 18 December: Saburo Hayakawa
Saitama Prefecture: 
 until 15 April: Niwa Shichiro
 15 April-18 December: Kozo Yamanaka
 starting 18 December: Umekichi Miyawaki 
Shiname Prefecture: 
 until 21 August: Keiichi Omori
 21 August-18 December: Kanichi Misawa
 starting 18 December: Rinsaku Yagi 
Tochigi Prefecture: 
 until 27 January: Harada
 20 January-27 December: Asari Saburo 
 starting 27 December: Chokichi Toshima
Tokyo: Torataro Shizuka (until 18 October); Hasegawa Hisakazu (starting 18 October)
Toyama Prefecture: Kozo Yamanaka (until 15 April); Keiichi Suzuki (starting 15 April)
Yamagata Prefecture: 
 until 24 October: Kubota Osamu Kosuke
 24 October-18 December: Ken Yamaguchi
 starting 18 December: Sada Kawamura

Events
March - March Incident
March 27 – A real estate brand, Shōei Corporation was founded, as predecessor for Hullic.
June 27 - Nakamura Incident
July 1 - Wanpaoshan Incident
September 21 – A Richer Scale magnitude 6.5 earthquake hit in Yorii, Saitama Prefecture. According to Japanese government official confirmed report, killing 16 persons, 146 persons were wounded.
October 21 - October Incident
November 4 - Resistance at Nenjiang Bridge
November 4–18 - Jiangqiao Campaign
Unknown date
 Teikyo Commerce School, later Teikyo University was founded in Tokyo.
 A time recorder and robot brand, Amano was founded in Yokohama, as predecessor name of Amano Manufacturing.
 A mail order cram school, Jitsuryoku-Zōshinsha (Ability Promotion), as predecessor of Zōshinsha Holdings (Z-kai) was founded.

Films
Tokyo Chorus

Births

January–March
January 2 – Toshiki Kaifu, Prime Minister of Japan
January 6 – Kaoru Yachigusa, actress (d. 2019)
January 20 – Ariyoshi Sawako, writer (d. 1984)
January 21 – Yoshiko Kuga, actress 
January 28 – Sakyo Komatsu, science fiction writer (d. 2011)
February 16 – Ken Takakura, actor (d. 2014)  
March 7 – Atsuko, Princess Yori, fourth daughter of Emperor Shōwa
March 9 – Masahiro Shinoda, film director

April–June
April 11 –  Koichi Sugiyama, composer and conductor (d. 2021)
May 10 – Ichirō Nagai, voice actor (d. 2014)
June 22 – Teruyuki Okazaki, black belt in Shotokan Karate (d. 2020)

July–September
July 5 – Ryuzo Sato, economist
July 11 – Yasuo Ōtsuka, animator (d. 2021)
August 29 – Ichikawa Raizō VIII, actor (d. 1969)
August 30 – Jōji Yanami, voice actor 
September 17 – Ayako Sono, writer
September 21 – Syukuro Manabe, Japanese-American meteorologist and climatologist

October–December
October 24 – Ken Utsui, actor (d. 2014)  
November 29 – Shintaro Katsu, actor (d. 1997)
December 5 – Kyōko Kagawa, actress
December 11 – Fujiko Yamamoto, actress
December 15 – Shuntarō Tanikawa, poet and translator
December 19 – Reiko Sato, actress and dancer (d. 1981)
December 31 – Sakata Tōjūrō IV, kabuki actor (d. 2020)

Full date unknown
Miyozo Yamazaki, amateur archaeologist

Deaths
January 27 – Nishinoumi Kajirō II, Sumo wrestler, 25th yokozuna (b. 1880)
June 13 – Kitasato Shibasaburō, physician and bacteriologist (b. 1853)
June 26 – Yamakawa Kenjirō, physicist, university president (b. 1854)
August 2 – Kinue Hitomi, sprinter and long jumper (b. 1907)
August 26 – Osachi Hamaguchi, Prime Minister of Japan (b. 1870)
September 2 – Ichinohe Hyoe, general (b. 1855)
November 11 – Shibusawa Eiichi, industrialist (b. 1840)

See also
 List of Japanese films of the 1930s

References

 
1930s in Japan
Japan